The Morris Plains Schools is a comprehensive community public school district that educates students from pre-kindergarten through eighth grade from Morris Plains, in Morris County, New Jersey, United States.

As of the 2018–19 school year, the district, comprising two schools, had an enrollment of 578 students and 61.0 classroom teachers (on an FTE basis), for a student–teacher ratio of 9.5:1.

The district is classified by the New Jersey Department of Education as being in District Factor Group "I", the second-highest of eight groupings. District Factor Groups organize districts statewide to allow comparison by common socioeconomic characteristics of the local districts. From lowest socioeconomic status to highest, the categories are A, B, CD, DE, FG, GH, I and J.

Students in public school for ninth through twelfth grades attend Morristown High School, as part of a sending/receiving relationship with the Morris School District, which also serves the communities of Morristown and Morris Township (for grades K-12). As of the 2018–19 school year, the high school had an enrollment of 1,860 students and 133.0 classroom teachers (on an FTE basis), for a student–teacher ratio of 14.0:1.

Schools
Schools in the district (with 2018–19 enrollment data from the National Center for Education Statistics) are:
Mountain Way School with 200 students in grades PreK-2
Christine Lion-Bailey, Principal
Morris Plains Borough School with 369 students in grades 3-8
Andrew Kramar, Principal

Administration
Core members of the district's administration are:
Mark Maire, Superintendent of Schools
Catherine Jenisch, Business Administrator / Board Secretary

Board of education
The district's board of education, with nine members, sets policy and oversees the fiscal and educational operation of the district through its administration. As a Type II school district, the board's trustees are elected directly by voters to serve three-year terms of office on a staggered basis, with three seats up for election each year held (since 2012) as part of the November general election.

References

External links
Morris Plains Schools
 
Morris Plains Schools, National Center for Education Statistics

Morris Plains, New Jersey
New Jersey District Factor Group I
School districts in Morris County, New Jersey